The Angel with the Trumpet may refer to:

 The Angel with the Trumpet (1948 film), Austrian
 The Angel with the Trumpet (1950 film), British